Sibel Güler Sağır (born September 28, 1984, in Bulgaria) is a Turkish taekwondo practitioner. She is a four-time medalist and two-time defending champion at the European Taekwondo Championships since 2004. She also claimed the middleweight division title at the 2005 Summer Universiade in Izmir, but won a silver medal at the 2007 Summer Universiade in Bangkok, Thailand, losing out to Chinese Taipei's Lin An-Ni in the final match.

Guler competed for the women's middleweight category (67 kg) at the 2008 Summer Olympics in Beijing, after defeating Greek taekwondo jin and Olympic silver medalist Elisavet Mystakidou in the final match of the European Qualification Tournament in Istanbul. She lost the first preliminary match to Argentina's Vanina Sánchez, who was able to score four points at the end of the game.

Family life
She was born to Cevat Güler and his wife Gülten, a Turkish family in Bulgaria. Sibel has a brother Sunay.

Sibel Güler was interested in swimming before she immigrated to Turkey with her family in 1989. During her school years in Turkey, she played in the volleyball team. In 1995, she began with taekwondo supported by her mother. With gaining success, she was transferred to TSE club in Ankara.

Güler studied at the School of Physical Education and Sports of Ankara University graduating in 2008. She has been a member of the Turkish women's national taekwondo team since 2000.

On August 30, 2008, she married Taner Sağır, a world and Olympic weightlifting champion and also an immigrant from Bulgaria. The couple has a child. The family resides in Ankara in a street named after Taner Sağır.

References

External links

NBC 2008 Olympics profile

Turkish female taekwondo practitioners
Bulgarian Turks in Turkey
1984 births
Living people
Olympic taekwondo practitioners of Turkey
Taekwondo practitioners at the 2008 Summer Olympics
Ankara University alumni
Turkish female martial artists
Universiade medalists in taekwondo
Universiade gold medalists for Turkey
Universiade silver medalists for Turkey
European Taekwondo Championships medalists
Medalists at the 2005 Summer Universiade
Medalists at the 2007 Summer Universiade
21st-century Turkish women